October is the Kindest Month is the second studio album by the folk-singer John Craigie. It was released in August 2011 on Zabriskie Point Records. Zach Gill and Randy Schwartz returned for this album, along with Steve Adams on bass and Holly McGarry and Shook Twins on backing vocals.

As with Montana Tale, it was placed in rotation on radio stations such as KHUM and KPIG.

Track listing

Personnel 
 John Craigie – acoustic guitar, ukulele, banjo, harmonica, vocals, producer
 Steve Adams - bass, acoustic bass, string bass 
 Randy Schwartz - percussion, vocals, producer
 Zach Gill  - piano, organ, accordion
 Shook Twins - vocals
 Holly McGarry - vocals

Production:
 Cian Riordan - engineering, mixing

References

John Craigie (musician) albums
2011 albums